Princewill Anthony Chike (born 28 June ?) is a Nigerian physician and professor of medicine. He was chairman of the Rivers State Primary Health Care Management Board. On 31 August 2017, he was sworn in as a member of second Wike Executive Council. He was chosen to head the Ministry of Health as Commissioner in September 2017.

References

Living people
Medical doctors from Rivers State
Commissioners of ministries of Rivers State
Health ministers of Nigeria
Year of birth missing (living people)